Labidomera suturella, commonly known as the tropical milkweed leaf beetle is a species of beetle from the family Chrysomelidae.

Description
L. suturella is a small, rounded beetle with a black head, pronotum, and elytra - the elytra are spotted with orange or yellow patches.

Distribution
L. suturella has a native range in Central and Southern America, from Northern Mexico to Brazil.

Lifecycle
Adults are active between April and August.

A study has shown that this species exhibits maternal care of larvae; they were observed guarding larvae whilst feeding on Witheringia heteroclita in Costa Rica This was a response to predatory threats, as worker ants of Paraponera clavata were observed carrying larvae to their nest.

Diet
As the common name suggests, L. suturella is primarily associated with milkweeds (Asclepias).

References

Chrysomelinae
Taxa named by Louis Alexandre Auguste Chevrolat